Anolis zeus is a species of lizard in the family Dactyloidae. The species is found in Honduras.

References

Anoles
Reptiles described in 2001
Endemic fauna of Honduras
Reptiles of Honduras
Taxa named by James Randall McCranie
Taxa named by Gunther Köhler